IBPB may refer to:

 IbpB, a protein
 Indirect Branch Prediction Barrier, an extended feature flag for the x86 architecture